Argyria is a genus of moths of the family Crambidae. The genus was described by Jacob Hübner in 1818.

Species
Argyria argyrodis Dyar, 1914
Argyria argyrostola (Hampson, 1919)
Argyria centrifugens Dyar, 1914
Argyria contiguella (Zeller, 1872)
Argyria croceicinctella (Walker, 1863)
Argyria croceivittella (Walker, 1863)
Argyria diplomochalis Dyar, 1913
Argyria divisella Walker, 1866
Argyria hannemanni Błeszyński, 1960
Argyria heringi Błeszyński, 1960
Argyria insons C. Felder, R. Felder & Rogenhofer, 1875
Argyria interrupta (Zeller, 1866)
Argyria lacteella (Fabricius, 1794)
Argyria lucidellus (Zeller, 1839)
Argyria lusella (Zeller, 1863)
Argyria mesogramma Dyar, 1913
Argyria multifacta Dyar, 1914
Argyria nummulalis Hübner, 1818
Argyria opposita Zeller, 1877
Argyria oxytoma Meyrick, 1932
Argyria plumbolinealis Hampson, 1896
Argyria polyniphas Meyrick, 1932
Argyria pontiella Zeller, 1877
Argyria quevedella Schaus, 1922
Argyria rufisignella (Zeller, 1872)
Argyria schausella Dyar, 1913
Argyria sericina (Zeller, 1881)
Argyria sordipes Zeller, 1877
Argyria subaenescens (Walker, 1863)
Argyria subtilis C. Felder, R. Felder & Rogenhofer, 1875
Argyria supposita Dyar, 1914
Argyria tripsacas (Dyar, 1921)
Argyria tunuistrigella Schaus, 1922
Argyria venatella (Schaus, 1922)
Argyria vesta Błeszyński, 1962
Argyria vestalis Butler, 1878
Argyria xanthoguma Dyar, 1914

Former species
Argyria antonialis Schaus, 1922
Argyria mesodonta Zeller, 1877
Argyria mesozonalis Hampson, 1919
Argyria submesodonta Błeszyński, 1960

References

Argyriini
Crambidae genera
Taxa named by Jacob Hübner